Dren Feka (born 9 June 1997) is a Kosovo Albanian professional footballer who plays as a defensive midfielder for 1. FC Phönix Lübeck.

Club career

Luzern
On 24 June 2017, Feka signed to Swiss Super League side Luzern. On 23 July 2017, he made his debut in a 1–0 home win against Lugano after being named in the starting line-up.

International career

Albania

Under-17
On 14 February 2013, Feka received a call-up from Albania U17 for the friendly matches against Slovenia U17 and Kosovo U17. On 20 February 2013, he making his debut with Albania U17 in match against Slovenia U17 after being named in the starting line-up.

Kosovo

Under-21
On 6 November 2017, Feka received a call-up from Kosovo U21 for a 2019 UEFA European Under-21 Championship qualification matches against Israel U21 and Azerbaijan U21, On 9 November 2017, he made his debut with Kosovo U21 in match against Israel U21 after being named in the starting line-up.

Senior
On 23 May 2018, Feka received a call-up from Kosovo for a friendly match against Albania. He was an unused bench in that match.

References

External links
 
 

1997 births
Living people
People from Bad Oldesloe
Footballers from Schleswig-Holstein
German people of Kosovan descent
German people of Albanian descent
Kosovo Albanians
Association football defenders
Kosovan footballers
Kosovo under-21 international footballers
Albanian footballers
Albania youth international footballers
German footballers
Germany youth international footballers
Hamburger SV II players
FC Luzern players
SV Drochtersen/Assel players
VfB Lübeck players
FC Rot-Weiß Koblenz players
Altonaer FC von 1893 players
1. FC Phönix Lübeck players
Swiss Super League players
Regionalliga players
Albanian expatriate footballers
Kosovan expatriate footballers
German expatriate footballers
Expatriate footballers in Switzerland
Albanian expatriate sportspeople in Switzerland
Kosovan expatriate sportspeople in Switzerland
German expatriate sportspeople in Switzerland